Ballatgi also spelled Ballatagi is a village in the Manvi taluk of Raichur district in the Indian state of Karnataka. It is located in the southwest district headquarters of Raichur town. Paddy crop is the chief export.

Demographics
 India census, Ballatgi had a population of 6096 with 3116 males and 2980 females.

See also
Mantralayam
Manvi
Lingasugur
Sindhanur
Raichur

References

External links
 http://raichur.nic.in

Villages in Raichur district